Since the amendment of the Constitution of the Republic of China in 1994 that introduced direct elections, there have been 11 unsuccessful candidates for President of the Republic of China. Since 1996, three third party or independent candidacies have won at least ten percent of the popular vote, but all failed to win the presidency.

List of unsuccessful candidates

Notes

References

Presidential elections in Taiwan
Lists of Taiwanese politicians
Presidency of the Republic of China